This is a summary of 1998 in music in the United Kingdom, including the official charts from that year.

Summary

The first chart of the year saw the BBC Children in Need single "Perfect Day", performed by a collaboration of various stars, return to the top of the charts for a week, displacing "Too Much" by the Spice Girls.

Disappearances and resurgences
January saw R'N'B vocalist, Usher Raymond score a No. 1 with his debut single "You Make Me Wanna..."; he would not return to the top of the UK singles charts until 2004. Although Usher's resurgence was yet to come, the lead singer of The Stone Roses was to resurge this year. Ian Brown released his debut solo single "My Star" which peaked at #5. His debut album also became a success, making No. 4 on the charts. Oasis also scored their 4th UK chart topper in January, which was their last release for two years as they embarked on a massive world tour which brought along the expected controversy and increased publicity for the band.

Girl groups and boy bands
Throughout the year, girl groups remained prevalent. All Saints who made No. 4 with their debut single "I Know Where It's At" in late 1997, clocked up 3 chart toppers across the year: the 1.25 million selling "Never Ever", popular covers of Red Hot Chili Peppers' "Under the Bridge" and Labelle's "Lady Marmalade" (both released as a double A-side) and laid-back dance track "Bootie Call", all tracks from their debut self-titled album, which itself was successful, reaching #2. They did not release any new material during 1999, but returned to the charts in 2000. Irish quartet B*Witched received great success across Europe and even mild success in the US, combining Irish folk with mainstream Western pop. Their debut single "C'est la Vie" made them the youngest group to debut at No. 1 in the UK and even went Top 10 in the US. Dance-associated "Rollercoaster" and emotional ballad "To You I Belong" quickly became 2 more UK chart toppers for the girls. Cleopatra, made up of three sisters from Manchester (Cleo, Zainam & Yonah), had major success in the United Kingdom, Europe and the United States. Their first 3 singles went straight into the top 5 of the UK singles chart and later that year they were signed to Madonna's U.S. label Maverick Records.

Success was facilitated for The All Saints and B*Witched because of the declining career of the Spice Girls. Their third release from their second album, Spiceworld, "Stop" was a minimal hit in the US and became their first single not to top the UK charts, ending the run of consecutive #1's at 6. Making matters worse, Geri Halliwell (also known as Ginger Spice) announced her departure from the group on 31 May after missing various concerts and an appearance on the national lottery. Their final release from their second album, "Viva Forever", was able to top the charts for 2 weeks. The video was an animated one with the Spice Girls featured as fairies, because at the time the Spice Girls were touring America; hence, they couldn't shoot a video for it. "Goodbye" became the girls' 8th chart topper at the end of the year, and was seen as a tribute to Geri. It took the Christmas number one position, making the Spice Girls only the second act to achieve 3 consecutive Christmas number one singles; the first being The Beatles. "Goodbye" was also the fastest selling single of 1998 shifting over 380,000 copies in just 7 days. Solo careers started for the two Melanies from the group in 1998 with Melanie B topping the UK charts with "I Want You Back", a duet with rapper Missy Elliott and Melanie C hitting No. 3 with "When You're Gone", a duet with Canadian rocker Bryan Adams. Whilst Melanie B's career slowly went into a downward spiral, Melanie C's was yet to grow.

Although the 1990s was full of boybands, 1998 was not the strongest year for them on the singles or albums chart. Five managed to have their debut album hit the top, but were yet to experience a No. 1 single. Boyzone were by far the most successful boyband of the year with 2 No. 1 singles "All That I Need", and "No Matter What", the latter of which sold over 1.07 million copies (it was taken from Andrew Lloyd Webber's musical, Whistle Down the Wind) and also saw their new album Where We Belong hit the top of the albums chart. American group Backstreet Boys would start the year with the release of All I Have To Give, their third and final single from their 1997 album Backstreet's Back. The single was big in the UK, reaching number 2. However, they had no more releases until the following year.

American acts
Many American acts this year were very successful in the UK, yet were still slightly more successful back home. Cher was biggest artist of the year on the chart. When "Believe", the lead single of her 22nd studio album of the same name, debuted atop on 31 October, it stayed on the spot for seven consecutive weeks (the longest running #1 of the year) and became the biggest-selling single of the year and in UK history by a female singer. Brandy & Monica made No. 2 with "The Boy Is Mine", which had a 13-week run at the top of the US chart, but it was a very successful year in the UK for Brandy, who had 2 No. 2 hits. Another US No. 1, "I'm Your Angel", by R. Kelly and Céline Dion, only made No. 3 in the UK. Mariah Carey hit No. 4 with solo release "My All", which became another chart-topper for her in the US; however, her duet with Whitney Houston, "When You Believe" from the soundtrack to The Prince of Egypt was a bigger hit in the UK than in the US, making No. 4 here and only making No. 15 on the Hot 100. Aerosmith scored their biggest global hit throughout their career to date: "I Don't Want to Miss a Thing", from the soundtrack to Armageddon, made No. 4 in the UK and entered the US charts at #1. Former Fugees member Lauryn Hill hit No. 3 with her debut solo single "Doo Wap (That Thing)", which topped the charts in the US. Her worldwide hit album, The Miseducation of Lauryn Hill was very successful in the UK, hitting No. 2 on the albums chart.

Other US acts who succeeded in the UK during 1998 but were not quite as popular back home were Aaron Carter and Madonna. Carter had his most successful year ever in the UK, clocking up 3 Top 30 hits and a place in the Top 20 with his eponymous debut album. Madonna failed to top the US charts, but did so in the UK, with "Frozen", becoming her 8th UK chart-topper; it was only able to make No. 2 in the US. Her new, dance-influenced, album, Ray of Light also topped the charts, producing several other hits including the title track which made #2. Hip Hop trio Destiny's Child began their career with the release of their single, "No, No, No", which made No. 5 in the UK and No. 3 in the US. Their debut album was a relative flop in both countries, but was more successful here than in the US.

Noted for its long-lasting popularity was the debut single from LeAnn Rimes, "How Do I Live", which spent 33 weeks in the UK Top 40, selling 714,000 copies and becoming the biggest-selling single ever to peak at No. 7 (it finished higher in the "year end" chart than in the weekly charts). It was more popular in the US, spending 32 weeks in the US Top 10, 61 weeks in the US Top 40 and 69 weeks on the Billboard Hot 100.

British acts

Two UK rock bands were prevalent on the albums and singles chart. The Verve's album Urban Hymns was number one for a total of 7 weeks. The album spawned two hit singles: the chart topping "The Drugs Don't Work" and the No. 2 hit, "Bittersweet Symphony", which was on the soundtrack to the film Cruel Intentions. Welsh rock band, Manic Street Preachers scored their first No. 1 single, "If You Tolerate This Your Children Will Be Next" and their new album This Is My Truth Tell Me Yours also topped the charts.

Ex-Take That member, Robbie Williams topped the albums chart twice during the year, when his debut album, Life Thru a Lens returned to the charts and managed to climb to the No. 1 spot. His second album, I've Been Expecting You topped the charts later on in the year and gave the star his first No. 1 single, "Millennium". I've Been Expecting You remains his biggest selling album, with over 2.7 million copies sold. Irish family folk band, The Corrs received massive success with their album, Talk on Corners which went on to sell over 2.7 million copies and topped the albums charts for 10 weeks (6 during 1998). The singles "Dreams", "So Young" and "What Can I Do?" from the album all reached the Top 10.

Acts from other countries
Australian singer Natalie Imbruglia followed up the success of her No. 2 hit "Torn" from 1997 with three more hits, two of which reached the top 5. Danish-Norwegian pop outfit, Aqua completed a hat-trick of Number Ones after the massive success of "Barbie Girl", as "Doctor Jones" and "Turn Back Time" both hit the top. The first was a slightly similar sounding track to their debut single, but "Turn Back Time" was a much slower track than their previous two singles. Their debut album, Aquarium reached No. 6 on the albums chart. They followed up their three consecutive Number Ones with two further hits by the end of the year; the former hit the Top 10 and the latter made the Top 20. They did not return to the UK charts until 2000.

Covers and reworkings
The 1996 hit "Three Lions", written for the Euro 96 football championships, was re-written for the World Cup as "Three Lions '98" and topped the charts for 3 weeks, becoming more successful than the original. Run DMC's 1983 hit "It's like That" was remixed by Jason Nevins and topped the charts for 6 weeks, selling 1.12 million copies. The song was one of the fastest selling singles of the year, and also kept the Spice Girls' "Stop" off the top of the charts, breaking the band's run of consecutive No. 1 singles. A Norman Cook remix of the Cornershop single, "Brimful of Asha" saw the British duo top the charts with a track that originally failed to make the Top 40 the previous year. The song comprised music from the duo's Indian roots with Western rock beats.

Popular genres
Various styles of rock bands topped the albums and singles charts in the earlier part of the year with everything from pop-rock to alternative electronic rock. This included Oasis, Garbage, Catatonia, Space, Embrace, Pulp and Massive Attack. Jamiroquai topped the singles chart with their release "Deeper Underground"; their album Synkronized made No. 1 the following year. Pop act Savage Garden reached No. 2 with their debut self-titled album, after the success of their No. 4 hit from 1997, "Truly Madly Deeply". Simply Red topped the albums chart with their new release Blue. Extending the success of pop acts on the albums chart during 1998 was singer Jane McDonald whose debut self-titled album topped the charts for 3 weeks. She released one single from the album, "Cruise into Christmas", a special release for the festive season which made No. 10 on the singles chart.

Breaking records
Age records were broken in 1998 at both ends of the spectrum. Billie became the second youngest solo female to obtain a chart topper at the age of 15 (Helen Shapiro being the youngest – 14 years old) and became the youngest solo female to enter at Number One. She had received a recording contract after appearing in an advertising campaign for Smash Hits magazine. Her debut single "Because We Want To" and follow up "Girlfriend" both topped the UK charts, each for one week. On the other end of the range, Cher at 52 years of age became the oldest solo female to top the UK charts. "Believe" topped the charts for 7 weeks, becoming the longest stay since "Wannabe" in 1996 and also the last single to spend more than 3 weeks at the top in that millennium. "Believe" also became the largest selling single by a female artist in the UK, with 1.67 million copies sold. Her album of the same name topped the charts on both sides of the Atlantic.

Greatest hits

The last few months of the year were filled with greatest hits compilations. Reaching No. 10 in the albums chart was a compilation from Mariah Carey of all her No. 1 singles to that point. It contained everything from her debut single "Vision of Love" to her most recent work "Honey", as well as some bonus tracks, "When You Believe", a duet with Whitney Houston, "Sweetheart" a duet with Jermaine Dupri, and "I Still Believe", a cover of the hit song from Brenda K. Starr. Other compilations came from Phil Collins, whose album was entitled Hits and from U2 who released The Best of 1980 – 1990 & B-sides. Both topped the albums chart. However, the most successful came from George Michael, who topped the albums chart for 8 weeks, the longest stay since Spice managed a consecutive 8-week run in 1996, with Ladies And Gentlemen – The Best of George Michael. It included his 7 UK number one singles, and other hits since his career began in 1984.

Hip hop 
The Beastie Boys had their biggest UK hit to date with the single "Intergalactic" which got to No. 4, and their studio album Hello Nasty got to #1. Unlike the previous year, where LL Cool J, Puff Daddy and Will Smith all topped the UK singles chart, no Hip Hop single reached number one. Jason Nevins's remix with Run DMC "It's like that" reached the top spot, but the remix is considered a dance song. Jay-Z and Busta Rhymes both got as high as #2. Pras Michel of The Fugees released his breakthrough track "Ghetto Superstar", featuring Mýa and ODB, was one of the best-selling tracks in the UK, selling 680,000 copies.

Film music

Film music dominated the February chart with the soundtrack to Titanic topping the albums chart for a cumulative total of 3 weeks. Composed by James Horner, the soundtrack included the song, "My Heart Will Go On". Sung by Céline Dion, it sold 1.31 million copies in the UK alone and topped the charts on both sides of the Atlantic. The film set a new record for box office sales.

English composer Anne Dudley won an Academy Award for Best Original Musical or Comedy Score for The Full Monty.  Work by Scottish composer Craig Armstrong was featured in the score of The Negotiator, and John Powell produced his second major film score, for Antz.

Classical music
Film composer John Barry produced his first full-length classical work, The Beyondness of Things.  One of Britain's most successful classical composers, Sir Michael Tippett, died at the age of 93, having developed pneumonia while visiting Stockholm for a retrospective of his concert music.  It was also the year when 12-year-old soprano Charlotte Church produced her first album, Voice of an Angel, which was certified triple platinum in UK sales alone, and launched her career as an opera crossover artist.  Her countryman, rising star Bryn Terfel, gave a recital at Carnegie Hall. Established opera singer Lesley Garrett released her hit album of the same name, including songs from popular musicals as well as operatic arias.

Events
 19 February - Danbert Nobacon of Chumbawamba pours a bucket of ice over UK Deputy Prime Minister John Prescott at the 1998 Brit Awards
 6 March - Liam Gallagher is charged with assault, for allegedly breaking a fan's nose in Brisbane, Australia after the fan took photographs.
 12 March - Liam Gallagher is banned from Hong Kong-based Cathay Pacific after he allegedly abused passengers and crew on a flight between the UK and Australia.
 25 March - Mark Morrison is arrested and sentenced to jail for paying a lookalike to perform his court-appointed community service in his stead, while Morrison went on tour.
 7 April - Mark E. Smith gets into fights and onstage arguments with The Fall bandmates during a gig in Brownies, New York.  The incident led to 3 members leaving, and on the following day, Smith is arrested and charged with assaulting member Julia Nagle.
 9 April - George Michael is arrested in a park in Beverly Hills, California after being caught in a "lewd act" by an undercover police officer, who was operating in a sting operation using so-called "pretty police". Michael was fined $810 and was sentenced to 80 hours community service.  Michael would soon "come out" and sent up the incident in his video for "Outside".
 24 May - The Verve play a homecoming gig at Haigh Hall & Country Park, Aspull, in front of 33,000 fans.
 31 May - Geri Halliwell announces her departure from the Spice Girls
 29 August - The Chart Show is dropped from ITV and is replaced with CD:UK, which ran until 2006.
 23 October - Former Stone Roses singer Ian Brown is jailed for threatening behaviour towards a stewardess on a British Airways flight from Paris, a charge he denied.  He is sentenced to Strangeways Prison, Manchester for four months and is released after serving two months of his sentence.
 12 November - Massive Attack win Best Video for "Teardrop" at the MTV Europe Music Awards ceremony, held in Milan.  They are presented their award by Sarah Ferguson, Duchess of York, who fluffs her lines, gets the band's name wrong and in response the band snub her and use profanity in their acceptance speech before leaving.

Charts

Number-one singles

Number-one albums

Number-one compilation albums

Year-end charts

Best-selling singles
Sales between 29 December 1997 and 2 January 1999.

Best-selling albums
Sales between 29 December 1997 and 2 January 1999.

Notes:

Best-selling compilation albums
Sales between 29 December 1997 and 2 January 1999.

Groups reformed
Culture Club

Groups disbanded
Black Grape
Carter the Unstoppable Sex Machine
Emerson, Lake & Palmer
Genesis
Menswear
Salad
Sleeper
Soul II Soul
Strangelove
Swervedriver
These Animal Men

Classical music
John Barry – The Beyondness of Things
Graham Fitkin – Clarinet Concerto
Matthew King – Gethsemane
Oliver Knussen – Eccentric Melody
Gordon McPherson – Miami
Mark-Anthony Turnage – Evening Songs

Opera
Gavin Bryars – Doctor Ox's Experiment
Jonathan Dove – Flight

Births
24 March – Isabel Suckling, singer
5 June – Dave, rapper, singer and songwriter
1 July – Hollie Steel, singer
8 August – Ronan Parke, singer
11 December – Gabz, Britain's Got Talent singer
24 December – Declan McKenna, singer-songwriter

Deaths
8 January – Sir Michael Tippett, composer, 95
5 February – Nick Webb, jazz musician and composer, 43/44 (pancreatic cancer)
24 February 
Geoffrey Bush, organist and composer, 77
Henny Youngman, British-born American comedian and violinist, 91
13 March – Judge Dread, ska and reggae performer, 52, (heart attack on stage)
20 March – Ivor Slaney, composer, 76
5 April – Cozy Powell, rock drummer, 50 (car crash)
17 April – Linda McCartney, US-born wife of Paul McCartney, businesswoman and member of Wings, 56 (breast cancer)
29 April – Harry Lewis, musician and composer, 83
19 May – Edwin Astley, composer, 76
3 July – George Lloyd, composer, 85
4 September – Lal Waterson, folk singer-songwriter, 55 (cancer)
25 October – Dick Higgins, composer, poet, printer and artist, 60 (heart attack)
4 December – John Hanson, Canadian-born tenor and West End star, 66
7 December – John Addison, film composer, 78
8 December – Michael Craze, actor and singer, 56 (heart attack)
21 December 
Avril Coleridge-Taylor, pianist, conductor, and composer, 95
Karl Denver, Scottish singer, 67

Music awards

BRIT Awards
The 1998 BRIT Awards winners were:

Best British producer: The Verve, Chris Potter and Youth
Best selling British album act: Spice Girls
Best soundtrack: "The Full Monty"
British album: The Verve – "Urban Hymns"
British breakthrough act: Stereophonics
British dance act: The Prodigy
British female solo artist: Shola Ama
British Group: The Verve
British male solo artist: Finley Quaye
British single: All Saints – "Never Ever"
British Video: All Saints  – "Never Ever"
Freddie Mercury award: Sir Elton John
International breakthrough act: Eels
International female: Björk
International group: U2
International male: Jon Bon Jovi
Outstanding contribution: Fleetwood Mac
Mercury Music Prize – Gomez, Bring It On.
The Record of the Year – Boyzone – "No Matter What".

See also
 1998 in British radio
 1998 in British television
 1998 in the United Kingdom
 List of British films of 1998

References

External links
BBC Radio 1's Chart Show
The Official Charts Company

 
British music
British music by year
20th century in music